The following lists events from 1993 in China.

Incumbents
General Secretary of the Communist Party: Jiang Zemin
President: Yang Shangkun (until 27 March), Jiang Zemin (starting 27 March)
Premier: Li Peng
Vice President: Wang Zhen (until 5 March), Rong Yiren (starting 12 March)
Vice Premier: Yao Yilin (until 5 March), Zhu Rongji (starting 25 March)

Governors 
 Governor of Anhui Province – Fu Xishou 
 Governor of Fujian Province – Jia Qinglin 
 Governor of Gansu Province – 
 until January: Jia Zhijie
 January-September: Yan Haiwang
 starting September: Zhang Wule
 Governor of Guangdong Province – Zhu Senlin 
 Governor of Guizhou Province – Wang Zhaowen then Chen Shineng 
 Governor of Hainan Province – Liu Jianfeng then Ruan Chongwu 
 Governor of Hebei Province – Cheng Weigao then Ye Liansong 
 Governor of Heilongjiang Province – Shao Qihui 
 Governor of Henan Province – Li Changchun then Ma Zhongchen 
 Governor of Hubei Province – Guo Shuyan then Jia Zhijie 
 Governor of Hunan Province – Chen Bangzhu
 Governor of Jiangsu Province – Chen Huanyou  
 Governor of Jiangxi Province – Wu Guanzheng  
 Governor of Jilin Province – Gao Yan 
 Governor of Liaoning Province – Yue Qifeng 
 Governor of Qinghai Province – Tian Chengping 
 Governor of Shaanxi Province – Bai Qingcai 
 Governor of Shandong Province – Zhao Zhihao 
 Governor of Shanxi Province – Hu Fuguo then Sun Wensheng 
 Governor of Sichuan Province – Zhang Haoruo then Xiao Yang 
 Governor of Yunnan Province – Li Jiating 
 Governor of Zhejiang Province – Wan Xueyuan

Events

January

Miss Chinese International Pageant 1993 took place on January 10.
January 9 – Shanghai Pudong Development Bank was founded.
January 31 – According to Chinese government official confirmed report, a passenger train smash into a passenger bus in level crossing in Liaoning Province, kills 66 person, 29 person were hurt.

February
February 14 – Linxi department store catches fire in Guye District, Tangshan, Hebei, killing 79 people.

April

China Eastern Airlines Flight 583 crashed on April 6.
April 22 – The China National Space Administration is established.

May

China competed at the East Asian Games from May 9 to May 18.

June

Typhoon Koryn (1993) was formed on June 13 and hit China.

August
August 27 – Gouhou Dam in Qinghai Province collapses killing at least 257.

October

1993 Shanghai International Film Festival took place from October 7 to 14.

References

 
Years of the 20th century in China
China
1990s in China